Me Too may refer to:

#MeToo movement, an international campaign to denounce sexual assault, rape, and harassment. 
#MeToo movement in China, an offshoot
#MeToo movement in India, an offshoot
#MeToo movement in Pakistan, an offshoot
#MeToo movement in South Korea, an offshoot
#MeTwo movement

Film and television
 Me Too! (British TV series)
 Me Too! (Canadian TV series), airing from 2002 to 2006 on CBC Kids
 Я тоже хочу, or Me Too, a 2012 film by Aleksei Balabanov
 MeToo, a defunct brand extension of MeTV by WMEU-CA

Music
Me Too (album), an album by Farrah
"Me Too" (Toby Keith song)
"Me Too" (Meghan Trainor song)
"Me Too (Ho Ha! Ho Ha!)", a song written by Harry M. Woods, Charles Tobias, and Al Sherman, and recorded by other artists; see Cuttin' Capers
"Me Too", a song by Jeff Carson, from Jeff Carson
"Me Too", a song by the Kinleys, from II

Other uses
USS Me-Too (SP-155), a United States Navy patrol boat
Me-too drug, a drug containing an active pharmaceutical ingredient that is structurally very similar to another
Me Too!, a children's book by Mercer Mayer

See also
 Me Two, a French film
 ME2 (disambiguation)
 Mewtwo, a Pokémon